Richard Parfitt (born 18 October 1974), also known as Rick Parfitt Jr, is a British musician, singer and former racing driver  who last competed in the 2022 British Touring Car Championship, driving for UptonSteel with Euro Car Parts Racing. He is the British GT champion in the GT3 and GT4 categories, and made his BTCC debut in 2021.

Career

Parfitt began racing in 1996, competing in various karting championships both nationally and internationally until 2004.
In 2010, he competed in the Silverstone 'Celebrity Race', of which he won, before competing in the Ginetta GT5 Challenge in 2012.

He stepped up to the British GT Championship in 2013, and competed in the GT4 category until 2015, when he switched to the GT3 category. He won the GT4 category in 2013 with Optimum Motorsport together with Ryan Ratcliffe, and won the GT3 category in 2017 with Bentley Team Parker together with Seb Morris.

Despite having announced that he would step back from racing at the end of 2018, he and his teammate Seb Morris returned to race in the 2019 British GT Championship.

After a sabbatical in 2020, in 2021 he made his British Touring Car Championship debut, driving for EXCELR8 with TradePriceCars.com in his return to Motorsport in a Hyundai i30N.

Personal life
He is the son of Status Quo musician Rick Parfitt.

He is a sufferer of Crohn's disease, and has been an advocate for raising awareness of the condition. He is an ambassador for Crohn's and Colitis UK.

He is the director of corporate event agency R&R Agency Ltd.

Racing record

Racing career summary 

† As Parfitt was a guest driver, he was ineligible for championship points.

Complete British GT Championship results
(key) (Races in bold indicate pole position) (Races in italics indicate fastest lap)

Complete British Touring Car Championship results
(key) Races in bold indicate pole position (1 point awarded – 2002–2003 all races, 2004–present just in first race) Races in italics indicate fastest lap (1 point awarded all races) * signifies that driver lead race for at least one lap (1 point awarded – 2002 just in feature races, 2003–present all races)

References

External links
 
 

Living people
1974 births
British GT Championship drivers
British Touring Car Championship drivers
English racing drivers
British racing drivers
Michelin Pilot Challenge drivers